Frederick I (29 April 1831 – 24 January 1904) was a German prince of the house of Ascania who ruled the Duchy of Anhalt from 1871 to 1904.

Early life
Frederick was born in Dessau in 1831 as the third child and only son of Duke Leopold IV of Anhalt-Dessau and his wife Princess Frederica of Prussia, the daughter of Prince Louis Charles of Prussia.

He studied in Bonn and Geneva, and in 1851 entered the Prussian military at Potsdam.

In 1863 he became heir to the united Duchy of Anhalt, when his father Leopold IV had inherited all the Anhalt territories following the death of the last Duke of Anhalt-Bernburg. 

In 1864, he participated in the Second Schleswig War in the staff of his brother-in-law, Prince Frederic Charles of Prussia, and in 1870-71 in the Franco-Prussian War as Lieutenant General. He was present at the proclamation of Wilhelm I as German Emperor in the Hall of Mirrors at the Versailles Palace on 18 January 1871.

Reign
Frederick succeeded his father as Duke of Anhalt on 22 May 1871.

On 23 January 1904 he suffered an apoplectic stroke and died the next day at Ballenstedt castle. As his eldest son Leopold had predeceased him, he was succeeded as Duke by his second son who became Frederick II.

Family

Marriage and issue
He was married on 22 April 1854 at Altenburg to Princess Antoinette of Saxe-Altenburg. She was a daughter of Prince Eduard of Saxe-Altenburg and his wife Princess Amalie of Hohenzollern-Sigmaringen. They had six children:

Honours
German orders and decorations

Foreign orders and decorations

Ancestry

References

 

House of Ascania
Dukes of Anhalt
1831 births
1904 deaths
Generals of Infantry (Prussia)
German military personnel of the Franco-Prussian_War
Grand Crosses of the Order of Saint Stephen of Hungary
Grand Crosses of the Order of the Star of Romania
Commanders Grand Cross of the Order of the Sword
Royal reburials
People from Dessau-Roßlau
Military personnel from Saxony-Anhalt